The Galicia–North Portugal Euroregion is a cross-border Euroregion straddling Galicia (Spain) and the North Region (Portugal). It was established in 2008.

This inter-regional co-operative effort has been shaped and justified both by the economic potential of a reinforced co-work of nearby northern Portuguese and Galician industrial core cities as well as by the historical, cultural and ethnolinguistic past that both territories traditionally shared and whose idiosyncrasy survived, although somewhat diluted, until our times. These common economic, political, cultural and societal ties can be traced back at least to the late Bronze Age, before the Romanization of northwestern Iberia and when the Castro Culture evidenced a common identity and heritage in this geographical area.

With the Romanization of these societies, their shared identity has been somewhat reflected and respected through the geo-culturally explained extension of the Roman province of Gallaecia. These far west populations tepidly and very gradually adapted to the manners and modus vivendi of the Romans, in what some historians considered to be a pacific co-habitation of different social realities. The lack of severe conflicts between the two different identities assured a relatively suitable cultural transition to the Middle Ages. After the dissolution of the Western Roman Empire, multiple geopolitical and strategical decisions impacted on one way or another in the organic continuation of this geographical and cultural region, although never as definitive as to break their historical attachment. It was during the Early and High Middle Ages that successive kingdoms, all of them related to the northwestern Christian Kingdoms that evolved during the early stages of the Reconquista, replaced one another depending on the location of the kingdom's seat, although both the North of Portugal and Galicia remained united and eventually formed the Kingdom of Galicia. Similarly, Galicia and the north of Portugal remained a cultural and social  fairly well defined continuum. 

However, by the 9th century the political unity of both territories already started to fade out when the title of count was given to the nobleman Vímara Peres by Alfonso III of Asturias after his successful campaign in the reconquest of Portus Cale (Porto). This landmark turned out decisive for the political fragmentation of both territories, leading to the formation of the County of Portugal. Although originally conceived as a vassalage of the Kingdoms of Asturias, Galicia and León, by the late 11th century it was reestablished after an increase of its counts power and finally recognized as an independent kingdom by the Kingdom of León.

Aside of this political division of interests, it was during this time period  that the Galician-Portuguese language became a reality and subsequently evidenced the common cultural and linguistic heritage that both kingdoms still shared. Their vernacular language became one of the most important lyrical and literary languages of Europe and was taken in great regard by the neighboring Castilian royal court. Among the conjointly claimed literary production written on any of both sides of the Minho River there is the Cantigas de Santa Maria, the Martín Codax's Pergaminho Vindel or the Cancioneiro da Ajuda.

The immersion into the Late Middle Ages signified a progressive historical and cultural deviance between the two territories that couldn't help but increase their geopolitical divergences during the Modern Period. Nevertheless, and despite the territorial expansion of Portugal up to the Algarve, located in the southwestern corner of the Iberian peninsula, both Galicia and the north of Portugal remained closely related from a sociocultural and bioclimatic point of view. Similarly, the Portuguese cities of Porto and Braga, two of the most populated and Ancient urban areas of Portugal, are located quite close to the Galician nearby cities of Vigo and Pontevedra and in a certain way they represent  as well a continuation of the moderate south–north conurbation that leads up to the medieval pilgrimage destiny and quintessentially Galician city of Santiago de Compostela. 

The tepid industrialization of both regions during the 19th and early 20th centuries led to the prevalence of the long lasting dissemination of the rural populations, specially high in Galicia by Spanish standards. This resemblance, a somewhat unique, singular and common trademark of these two regions, has been attempted to be explained by authors of both sides of the Minho River; Galician politician and writer Alfonso Daniel Rodríguez Castelao in his essay book Sempre en Galiza traced this trend back to the Celts idiosyncratic inclination towards Nature, as the already mentioned Castro Culture is considered by some authors to be the local development of Ancient Celtic tribes that settled along the Atlantic regions of northwestern Iberia. Castelao also believed to have found a direct translation and bounding of these pre-Roman settlements with the Christian northwestern parroquias, the traditional political and religious territorial configuration of these very disseminated populations. In an illustrative attempt to clarify this reality, two early to mid 20th century photographers serve as witnesses of the resemblance of these regions; on one side, Amarante-born photographer Eduardo Teixeira Pinto captured the distinctive character of the northern Portuguese people and their particular contextual environments, as American Ruth Matilda Anderson did twenty years before with the Galician homologues.  

By the late 20th and early 21st centuries the industrial and economic improvements of both Portugal and Spain and their membership into the European Union, have led to an increasing exchange of services and benefits between them as with the rest of the union members. In the particular case of Galicia and the north of Portugal, their prevalent social ties and cultural resemblance along with the demand for a mutual and strengthen infrastructure and city-based economy is demanding better transport services and connections between neighboring cities like Vigo or Porto as well as many other agreements of very diverse nature: cultural and educational exchanges, bilateral political strategies or ethnogastronomic accords among others. The Euroregion domain that conjoin both the North of Portugal and Galicia attempts to reinforce these desired achievements. 

Euroregions
Geography of Galicia (Spain)
Geography of Portugal